The 2017 Davis Cup World Group Play-offs were held from September 15 to 17. They were the main play-offs of the 2017 Davis Cup. The winners of the playoffs advanced to the 2018 Davis Cup World Group, and the losers were relegated to their respective Zonal Regions I.



Teams
Bold indicates team had qualified for the 2018 Davis Cup World Group.

From World Group
 
 
 
 
 
 
 
 

 From Americas Group I

 
  

 From Asia/Oceania Group I

 
 

 From Europe/Africa Group I

Results summary
Date: 15–17 September

The eight losing teams in the World Group first round ties and eight winners of the Zonal Group I final round ties competed in the World Group Play-offs for spots in the 2018 World Group.  The draw took place on April 11 in London.

Seeded teams

 
 
 
 
 
 
 
 

Unseeded teams

 
 
 
 
 
 
 
 

Playoff results

Kazakhstan vs. Argentina

Colombia vs. Croatia

Switzerland vs. Belarus

Netherlands vs. Czech Republic

Portugal vs. Germany

Japan vs. Brazil

Hungary vs. Russia

Canada vs. India

References

World Group Play-offs